The Royal Louis was a ship of the line of the French Royal Navy. She was constructed at Toulon between 1666 and 1669 under the direction of Rodolphe Gédéon and served as flagship of the French fleet in the Mediterranean.

While intended when first built to serve as the flagship of François de Bourbon-Vendome, Duc de Beaufort, for the Cretan campaign of 1669, she was not ready in time and she saw no service until 1677. She underwent reconstruction at Toulon from December 1676 to April 1677; four of her 24-pounder guns were replaced by four 36-pounders on the lower deck, two more 18-pounders were added on her middle deck, and two 6-pounders were removed from her quarterdeck, thus keeping her as a 104-gun ship.

She then sailed from Toulon on 11 May 1677, under the command of Abraham Duquesne, to Messina in Sicily, at the head of a small squadron to support rebels opposing Spanish rule there. On returning to Toulon, she saw no further sea service until taken out of service in 1691.

On his visit to Toulon in 1683, the English naval engineer Edmund Dummer described the Royal Louis as "a great ship and glorious in her first carving, no doubt; but to my judgment not of good proportion, nor good workmanship, her figure under water I know not, nor is that above to be admired".

She was removed from service in 1691, and taken to pieces at Toulon in 1697, having been replaced by a new First Rank ship of the same name.

References

Nomenclature des Vaisseaux du Roi-Soleil de 1661 a 1715. Alain Demerliac (Editions Omega, Nice – various dates).
The Sun King's Vessels (2015) - Jean-Claude Lemineur; English translation by François Fougerat. Editions ANCRE.  
Winfield, Rif and Roberts, Stephen (2017) French Warships in the Age of Sail 1626-1786: Design, Construction, Careers and Fates. Seaforth Publishing. . 

Ships of the line of the French Navy
1660s ships